The 1938 Northern Illinois State Evansmen football team represented Northern Illinois State Teachers College—now known as Northern Illinois University—as a member of the Illinois Intercollegiate Athletic Conference (IIAC) during the 1938 college football season. Led by tenth-year head coach Chick Evans, the Evansmen compiled an overall record of 6–1–1 with a mark of 4–0 in conference play, winning the IIAC title. The team played home games at the 5,500-seat Glidden Field, located on the east end of campus, in DeKalb, Illinois.

Schedule

References

Northern Illinois State
Northern Illinois Huskies football seasons
Interstate Intercollegiate Athletic Conference football champion seasons
Northern Illinois State Evansmen football